Mingo Run is a  long 2nd order tributary to Buffalo Creek in Brooke County, West Virginia.

Course
Mingo Run rises in a pond about 0.5 miles west of Independence, West Virginia, and then flows southwesterly to join Buffalo Creek about 2 miles northwest of Bethany.

Watershed
Mingo Run drains  of area, receives about 40.1 in/year of precipitation, has a wetness index of 319.38, and is about 55% forested.

See also
List of rivers of West Virginia

References

Rivers of West Virginia
Rivers of Brooke County, West Virginia